Atelopus chocoensis, the Chocó stubfoot toad, is a species of toad in the family Bufonidae endemic to Colombia.  Its natural habitat is subtropical or tropical moist montane forests. It is threatened by habitat loss.

References

chocoensis
Amphibians of Colombia
Endemic fauna of Colombia
Amphibians described in 1992
Taxonomy articles created by Polbot
Fauna of the northwestern Andean montane forests